The Conspiracy of Pontiac is an American silent film produced by Kalem Company and directed by Sidney Olcott with Gene Gauntier, Robert Vignola and Jack J. Clark in the leading roles. It is a story of the Indian war after the conquest of Canada.

A copy is kept in the Desmet collection at Eye Film Institute (Amsterdam).

Cast
 Gene Gauntier as Indian Girl
 Robert G. Vignola
 Jack J. Clark as Major Gladwynn
 Arthur Donaldson as Indian chief

External links

 The Conspiracy of Pontiac website dedicated to Sidney Olcott
Film at YouTube

1910 films
Silent American drama films
American silent short films
Films set in Canada
Films directed by Sidney Olcott
1910 short films
1910 drama films
American black-and-white films
1910s American films